Borislav Jeliazkov is a Bulgarian mixed martial artist. He competed in the Heavyweight division.

Mixed martial arts record

|-
| Loss
| align=center| 5-6
| Mikhail Ilyukhin
| Submission (armbar)
| Rings: World Title Series 2
| 
| align=center| 2
| align=center| 2:06
| Kanagawa, Japan
| 
|-
| Win
| align=center| 5-5
| Konstantin Uriadov
| Submission (rear naked choke)
| Rings Russia: Russia vs. Bulgaria
| 
| align=center| 1
| align=center| 3:09
| Yekaterinburg, Russia
| 
|-
| Loss
| align=center| 4-5
| Ryushi Yanagisawa
| Submission (toe hold)
| Rings: King of Kings 2000 Block A
| 
| align=center| 1
| align=center| 3:45
| Tokyo, Japan
| 
|-
| Win
| align=center| 4-4
| David Safarov
| Submission (choke)
| Rings Russia: Russia vs. Bulgaria
| 
| align=center| 1
| align=center| 0:00
| Tula, Russia
| 
|-
| Win
| align=center| 3-4
| Igor Perminov
| KO (knee to the body)
| Rings Russia: Russia vs. The World
| 
| align=center| 1
| align=center| 1:15
| Yekaterinburg, Sverdlovsk Oblast, Russia
| 
|-
| Loss
| align=center| 2-4
| Bobby Hoffman
| KO (punch)
| Rings: Millennium Combine 1
| 
| align=center| 1
| align=center| 8:00
| Tokyo, Japan
| 
|-
| Loss
| align=center| 2-3
| Kiyoshi Tamura
| Submission (rear naked choke)
| Rings: King of Kings 1999 Block B
| 
| align=center| 2
| align=center| 1:17
| Osaka, Japan
| 
|-
| Win
| align=center| 2-2
| Tim Lajcik
| Submission (rear naked choke)
| Rings: King of Kings 1999 Block B
| 
| align=center| 1
| align=center| 2:23
| Osaka, Japan
| 
|-
| Loss
| align=center| 1-2
| Wataru Sakata
| Submission (armbar)
| Rings: Rise 4th
| 
| align=center| 1
| align=center| 6:49
| Japan
| 
|-
| Win
| align=center| 1-1
| Wataru Sakata
| Submission (scarf hold)
| Rings: Rise 1st
| 
| align=center| 1
| align=center| 8:28
| Japan
| 
|-
| Loss
| align=center| 0-1
| Tsuyoshi Kosaka
| Decision (lost points)
| Rings: Mega Battle Tournament 1997 Semifinal 1
| 
| align=center| 1
| align=center| 0:00
| Japan
|

See also
List of male mixed martial artists

References

External links
 
 Borislav Jeliazkov at mixedmartialarts.com
 Borislav Jeliazkov at fightmatrix.com

Bulgarian male mixed martial artists
Heavyweight mixed martial artists
Living people
Year of birth missing (living people)